is a Japanese model who is represented by Platinum Production.

Biography
Sonmi is a South Korean resident in Japan. She is represented by Platinum Production.

Sonmi, with her father in Macau, was involved with gambling at the Cam Peck Casino, Kinpecki Amusement Park.

On 2012, she was selected, with Erika Kiyota, Rie Tanabe, and Maki Shima, as the image girl of Osaka Auto Messe.

Filmography

TV series

Modelling

References

External links
 

Japanese female models
1989 births
Living people
People from Osaka Prefecture
Japanese people of South Korean descent